The Lightner Museum is a museum of antiques, mostly American Gilded Age pieces, housed within the historic Hotel Alcazar building in downtown St. Augustine. This 1887 Spanish Renaissance Revival style building is listed on the National Register of Historic Places.

History

Hotel Alcazar
The hotel was commissioned by Henry Flagler, to appeal to wealthy tourists who traveled south for the winter on his railroad, the Florida East Coast Railway. It was designed by New York City architects Carrère and Hastings, in the Spanish Renaissance Revival style. The firm also designed the Ponce de León Hotel across the street, now part of the campus of Flagler College. Both structures are notable for being among the earliest examples of poured concrete buildings in the world. These architects later designed the New York Public Library in New York City and the Russell Senate Office Building in Washington, D.C.

The hotel had a steam room, massage parlor, sulfur baths, gymnasium, a three-story ballroom, and the world's largest indoor swimming pool; however, after years as an elegant winter resort for wealthy patrons, the hotel closed in 1932.

On August 20, 1947 Chicago publisher Otto C. Lightner purchased the building to convert the old hotel into a hobbies museum. He used the space to house several collections, including his own extensive collection of Victorian era art. He then turned it over to the city of St. Augustine and the museum opened to the public in 1948.

The building is an attraction in itself, centering on an open courtyard with palm trees and a stone arch bridge over a koi pond.

Museum
The museum occupies three floors of the former Hotel Alcazar and is housed in the former health facilities of the hotel, including the spa and the Turkish bath, in addition to its three-story ballroom.

The first floor of the museum houses a Victorian Science and Industry Room displays shells, rocks, minerals, and Native American artifacts in beautiful Gilded Age cases, as well as stuffed birds, a small Egyptian mummy, a model steam engine, elaborate examples of Victorian glassblowing, a golden elephant bearing the world on its back, and a shrunken head. Moreover, the first floor contains a music room, filled with mechanized musical instruments—including player pianos, reproducing pianos, orchestrions, and others—dating from the 1870s through the 1920s. It formerly featured a Victorian village, with shop fronts representing emporia selling period wares; this area is now the gift shop.

The second floor contains examples of cut glass, Victorian art glass and stained-glass work from Louis Comfort Tiffany's studio. The third floor, in the ballroom's upper balcony, exhibits paintings, sculptures, and furniture, including a grande escritoire created for Louis Bonaparte, Napoleon's brother and King of Holland between 1806 and 1810.                       
The Ballroom Gallery has oil paintings by Paul Trouillebert (Cleopatra & the Dying Messenger), Léon Comerre (Maid of Honor), and Albert Bierstadt (In the Yosemite). It also has sculptures by Jean-Baptiste Carpeaux and Randolph Rogers.

On view from the ballroom's upper balcony is the now drained swimming pool. The pool now hosts the Cafe Alcazar.

Gallery

See also 
National Register of Historic Places listings in St. Johns County, Florida

References
 Ossman, Laurie; Ewing, Heather (2011). Carrère and Hastings, The Masterworks. Rizzoli USA. .

External links

"Florida's Smithsonian"

Hotel buildings completed in 1887
Museums in St. Augustine, Florida
Art museums and galleries in Florida
Decorative arts museums in the United States
History museums in Florida
National Register of Historic Places in St. Johns County, Florida
Historic American Buildings Survey in Florida
Carrère and Hastings buildings
Spanish Revival architecture in Florida